Visitors to Burkina Faso must obtain a visa from one of the Burkina Faso diplomatic missions unless they come from one of the visa exempt countries or a country whose citizens may obtain a visa on arrival.

Visa policy map

Visa exemption 
Citizens of the following 19 countries can visit Burkina Faso without a visa:

#: Not listed by Timatic as being visa-exempt.

Non-ordinary passports
Additionally, holders of diplomatic and service category passports issued to nationals of Brazil, China, Congo, Cuba, Russia, Taiwan, Turkey do not require a visa for Burkina Faso. In addition, nationals of China holding passports endorsed "for public affairs" do not require a visa for a maximum stay of 90 days.

Visa on arrival
Visas are available on arrival at the airport and borders for the following 51 nationalities for a stay of up to 1 month. The cost of the visa on arrival is 94,000 francs CFA (€143.30) for a single entry visa with a maximum validity of 3 months, or 122,000 CFA (€185.99) for multiple entry visa with a maximum validity of three months.

1 — only at Ouagadougou airport

Visa on arrival is available for holders of diplomatic, official, service or special passports free of charge. Visa on arrival is also available for holders of an Interpol passport traveling on duty.

Transit without a visa
Nationals of South Africa require a visa prior to arrival at all times, including transit. Other nationalities holding confirmed onward tickets may transit through airports of Burkina Faso up to 24 hours without a transit visa.

Visitor statistics
Most visitors arriving to Burkina Faso for tourism purposes were from the following countries of nationality:

See also

 Visa requirements for Burkinabe citizens

References 

Burkina Faso
Foreign relations of Burkina Faso